East Champaran is an administrative district in the state of Bihar in India.The district headquarters are located at Motihari. Prior to 1st Dec 1977, there was a single district called "Champaran". On 1 December 1977, the district was divided into 2 parts (Purvi Champaran) East Champaran and (Paschimi Champaran) West Champaran. In early days the land of East Chamapran was ruled by different kingdoms as Videha, Sunga, Kanvas. It is also believed that Champaran used to be a major part of King Janak's empire. Mahatma Gandhi Started his famous Satyagraha movement from here. 
Proper district Entry Point Mangrahi, Bakhari in Mehsi Champaran

About district
East Champaran District is functioning from 2 November 1972. The headquarter of the district is at Motihari. It is situated at 26° 16′ to 27° 1′ North latitude and 84° 30′ to 85° 16′ East longitudes. Nepal makes its northern boundary, Sitamarhi and Sheohar eastern while Mehsi, Muzaffarpur South and with part of Gopalganj and West Champaran bounds it in western side.

The district occupies an area of 3969 km2 and has a population of 5,099,371. East Champaran is a part of Tirhut Division (Tirhut). It is currently a part of the Red Corridor.

As of 2011, it is the second most populous district of Bihar (out of 38), after Patna.

East Champaran is the second most crowded district of Bihar. The district gets its name from the union of two words, champa and aranya. Champa alludes to scented blossom trees and Aranya alludes to the home or an encased spot. The name began back in when the district was encircled by a backwoods of magnolia (champa) trees.

Tourist Places

Someshwar Nath Mandir, Areraj 

Someshwar Nath Mahadev Mandir is a well established temple situated in Areraj. The significant divinity of the heavenly temple is of Lord Shiva. Explorers and pilgrims of Lord Shiva go to the holy place from India as well as from Nepal. The merriments on the event of an occasional reasonable known as Shrawani Mela, during July and August, are really pleasant. There are numerous different temples nearby around and thus just, Areraj is known as the holy place of East Champaran.

Ashokan Pillar 
Ashokan Pillar is situated in Lauria Nandangarh, or Lauriya Navandgarh which is a city or town around 14 km from Narkatiaganj and 28 km from Bettiah in West Champaran district of Bihar state in northern India. It is found near the banks of the Budhi Gandak River. Lauriya Nandangarh is a chronicled place which goes under West Champaran district of Bihar.

Kesariya 
Kesariya is arranged on the eastern banks of the river Gandak and views the enormous 104-feet-tall stupa, which is viewed as the tallest Buddhist stupa. In like manner, Kesariya orders conspicuous situations in East Champaran the travel industry just as history of Buddhism. The stupa was found in the year 1998.

Raxaul 
Raxaul is one of the most significant towns of the East Champaran district. By excellence of its topographical area, it is known as the Gateway to Nepal.

Moti Jheel 
Situated in the core of the Motihari city, Moti Jheel is the most excellent fascination of the city that isolates Motihari into two parts.

NREGA Park 

A lovely and beguiling spot to appreciate with loved ones.

Champaran in Gallary

Gandhi Memorial 
Gandhi Memorial is situated in Chandrahiya town, On his visit to Champaran Gandji jee was stopped in this town. Chandrahiya is a town in Bihar's East Champaran district which is around 8 KM away from district headquarter Motihari.

Champaran Satyagrah Park 
The Champaran Satyagraha Shatabdi Park located at the district headquarter of East Champaran.The Park has been built by the Urban Development and Housing office. Neighborhood individuals appreciate the freshness of this park with family, relatives, friends on weekend and holidays.

George Orwell Monument 
The origin of perhaps the most commended scholars of the 20th century and the writer of a few acclaimed books, George Orwell.

Sitakund 
Found 16 Kms from Pipra Railway Station, Sitakund is acclaimed as where Goddess Sita took a heavenly plunge.

Geography
Gandak, Burhi Gandak and Baghmati are important rivers flowing through this region.

Demographics

According to the 2011 census East Champaran district has a population of 5,099,371, roughly equal to the United Arab Emirates or the US state of Colorado. This gives it a ranking of 21st in India (out of a total of 640). Its population growth rate over the decade 2001–2011 was 29.01%. Purbi Champaran has a sex ratio of 901 females for every 1000 males, and a literacy rate of 55.79%. 7.87% of the population lives in urban areas. Scheduled Castes and Scheduled Tribes make up 12.74% and 0.24% of the population respectively.

Languages

According to the 2011 census, 82.67% of the population spoke Bhojpuri, 7.33% Urdu and 7.06% Hindi as their first language. 2.58% of the population spoke 'Others' under Hindi.

Politics 
  

|}

See also
 Mehsi
 Raxaul
 Dhaka, East Champaran 
 George Orwell
 Ramesh Chandra Jha
 Districts of Bihar
 Ravish Kumar
 Sanjeev K Jha

References

External links

 East Champaran district website
 Official Website of Tirhut Division
 Motihari (East Champaran)
 East Champaran District Info

 
Tirhut division
Districts of Bihar